Kunturiri (Aymara kunturi condor, -(i)ri a suffix, Hispanicized spelling Condoriri) is a mountain in the Cordillera Real of Bolivia, about  high. It is also the name of the whole massif. Kunturiri is located in the La Paz Department, Los Andes Province, Pukarani Municipality, southeast of Chachakumani and northwest of Huayna Potosí.

The central part of the Kunturiri group is formed by three peaks which resemble a condor with wings spread:
 the Kunturiri itself, also called Cabeza de(l) Condor (Spanish for "head of the condor"),
 Ala Izquierda ("left wing"), Ala Norte ("north wing"), the Kunturiri west peak and
 Ala Derecha ("right wing") or Ala Sur ("south wing").

Other peaks in the Kunturiri massif are Pico Reya, Qallwani (Yugoslavia) 2 km north of Kunturiri, Wintanani, Pico Eslovenia, Pequeño Alpamayo, Pico Medio, Ilusión, Aguja Negra, Jist'aña, Diente, Ilusioncita, Tarija and Titicaca. The Spanish names of the peaks do not occur in the maps of the Bolivian IGM (Instituto Geográfico Militar).

The lakes Ch'iyar Quta and Juri Quta are situated south of the massif.

See also
Jist'aña

References 

Mountains of La Paz Department (Bolivia)
Glaciers of Bolivia
Five-thousanders of the Andes